Tuvvur is a village in Malappuram district in the state of Kerala, India. This village has mosques, temples, churches and people of different religions are living in this village.

Demographics
 India census, Tuvvur had a population of 26795 with 12973 males and 13822 females.

Education 
 Govt. Higher Secondary School, Tuvvur
 Govt. High School, Neelancheri
 Tharakkal AUP School, Tuvvur
 GLPS, Tuvvur
 GMLPS, Mampuzha
 GMLPS, Akkarakkulam
 GMLPS, Mundakkodu
 ALPS, Akkarappuram

Transportation
Tuvvur village connects to other parts of India through road and rail. About six kilometers of State Highway 39 (SH 39) between Perumbilavu and Nilambu run through Tuvvur. Pandikkad in State Highway 73 (SH 73) connecting Valanchery and Nilambur is about 9 km from Tuvvur. The nearest airport is at Kozhikode.  The nearest railway station is Tuvvur in the Nilambur Road-Shoranur line.

Image Gallery

For more images see:

 Plants of Tuvvur
 Insects of Tuvvur

References

   Villages in Malappuram district
Nilambur area